This is a list about the American players who represented the United States men's national soccer team naturalized and born abroad. Many of this players immigrated from all over the world, from continents like Europe (especially British countries), Africa, Asia and Latin America. There are also players who are born outside the U.S. but because a family member was working there (for example some players were born in Germany because their father was doing the military service there).

List by country

List of players 
Last update on 27 January 2023; players in bold are currently representing United States internationally.

References 

born outside
United States
Association football player non-biographical articles
Immigration to the United States
American diaspora
United States